Torrens Park railway station is located on the Belair line in suburban Adelaide in South Australia. Located 9.3 kilometres from Adelaide station, it serves the inner southern suburb of Torrens Park.

History 
The station opened in 1914 as Blythwood, being renamed Torrens Park in 1921. In 1992, the Australian Plants Society commenced the Torrens Park Railway Station Project which made the surrounding area look much more attractive.

In 1995, the western side platform was closed when the inbound line was converted to standard gauge as part of the One Nation Adelaide-Melbourne line gauge conversion project. The disused platform was demolished in March 2008.

Services by platform

Gallery

References

External links

Railway stations in Adelaide